Carl Erik Rasmus Sandin (born 7 March 2000) is a Swedish professional ice hockey defenceman for the Washington Capitals of the National Hockey League (NHL). He was selected in the first round, 29th overall by the Toronto Maple Leafs in the 2018 NHL Entry Draft. Sandin has previously played for the Maple Leafs and Rögle BK of the Swedish Hockey League (SHL).

Playing career
At 16 years old, Sandin began his major junior career in 2016 playing for Brynäs IF at the J20 level. He was selected by the Sault Ste. Marie Greyhounds in the 2017 Canadian Hockey League (CHL) Import Draft. He made his professional debut in playing five games for the Rögle BK of the Swedish Hockey League (SHL) before joining the Greyhounds for the 2017–18 season. At the end of the regular season, Sandin was awarded the Rookie of the Year award by the team. He was later announced as an OHL finalist for the Emms Family Award.

Sandin was ranked the 11th best North American prospect according to the final NHL Central Scouting Report. On 22 June 2018, Sandin was chosen in the first round, 29th overall, by the Toronto Maple Leafs in the 2018 NHL Entry Draft. He later agreed to a three-year, entry-level contract with the Maple Leafs on 16 July. Sandin began the 2018–19 season with the Toronto Marlies, the Toronto Maple Leafs' American Hockey League affiliate, after being cut from training camp. During the season, Sandin set a new team record for longest point streak by a defenceman. Sandin finished the 2018–19 season with six goals and 28 points in 44 regular season games. Sandin played his first NHL game against the Ottawa Senators on 2 October 2019, recording one assist in a 5–3 win. He eventually recorded his first career NHL goal on 27 January 2020, in a 5–2 win over the Nashville Predators.

During the 2022–23 season, approaching the NHL trade deadline, Sandin was dealt by the Maple Leafs to the Washington Capitals in exchange for Erik Gustafsson and a 2023 first-round draft pick on 28 February 2023.

Personal life

Sandin has an older brother Linus who is a player for Rögle BK of the Swedish Hockey League ŪSHL). He formerly played for the Philadelphia Flyers.

Career statistics

Regular season and playoffs

International

References

External links
 
 

2000 births
Living people
National Hockey League first-round draft picks
Rögle BK players
Sault Ste. Marie Greyhounds players
Sportspeople from Uppsala
Swedish expatriate ice hockey players in Canada
Swedish ice hockey defencemen
Toronto Maple Leafs draft picks
Toronto Maple Leafs players
Toronto Marlies players
Washington Capitals players